The Writers Guild of America Award for Best Television Writing in a Comedy/Variety Specials is an award presented by the Writers Guild of America to the best written television comedy or variety specials. During the 70s, different categories were presented to recognize writing in comedy or variety specials until 1987, when the category Variety – Musical, Award, Tribute, Special Event started to be awarded, later being renamed to its current name, Comedy/Variety Special.

Winners and nominees
The winners are indicated in gold and in bold.

1970s
Best Written Variety Script

Best Variety Series or Special – Musical or Comedy

1980s
 Best Variety, Musical or Comedy

Variety – Musical, Award, Tribute, Special Event

Variety – Musical

1990s
Variety - Musical, Award, Tribute, Special Event

Comedy/Variety - Music, Awards, Tributes - Specials - Any Length

2000s
Comedy/Variety (Music, Awards, Tributes) – Specials

2010s

2020s

References

Writers Guild of America Awards